Anacamptis morio subsp. syriaca is a subspecies of orchid. It has been found in Turkey and Lebanon.

References

External links 

morio subsp. syriaca
Orchids of Lebanon
Plant subspecies